Norberto Orejel Ochoa (born December 21, 1990 in Riverside, California) is an American soccer player who plays for Moreno Valley Futbol Club of the United Premier Soccer League.

Career

College and Amateur
Ochoa began playing college soccer at Mt. San Antonio College in 2011 and 2012. Following two years in San Antonio, Ochoa spent time in Europe with both SC Rheindorf Altach and Club Brugge.

Ochoa also spent one year as a senior at UC Riverside.

Professional
Ochoa signed with United Soccer League side Charlotte Independence on March 24, 2016.

References

External links
 UC Riverside player profile

1990 births
Living people
American soccer players
UC Riverside Highlanders men's soccer players
Charlotte Independence players
USL League Two players
National Premier Soccer League players
USL Championship players
United Premier Soccer League players
Soccer players from Riverside, California
Association football forwards
FC Golden State Force players